Paracinipe is a genus of grasshoppers in the family Pamphagidae. There are about 18 described species in Paracinipe, found in northern Africa and the Middle East.

Species
These 18 species belong to the genus Paracinipe:

 Paracinipe adelaidae Massa, 1996
 Paracinipe alticola (Werner, 1932)
 Paracinipe baccettii Massa, 1996
 Paracinipe crassicornis (Bolívar, 1907)
 Paracinipe dolichocera (Bolívar, 1907)
 Paracinipe exarata (Bolívar, 1936)
 Paracinipe foreli (Pictet & Saussure, 1893)
 Paracinipe luteipes Descamps & Mounassif, 1972
 Paracinipe luteomaculata Descamps & Mounassif, 1972
 Paracinipe marmarica (Salfi, 1925)
 Paracinipe mauritanica (Bolívar, 1878)
 Paracinipe orientalis (Werner, 1908)
 Paracinipe rubripes Descamps & Mounassif, 1972
 Paracinipe saharae (Pictet & Saussure, 1893)
 Paracinipe suezensis Ünal & Massa, 2016
 Paracinipe sulphuripes (Uvarov, 1942)
 Paracinipe theryi (Werner, 1931)
 Paracinipe zebrata (Brunner von Wattenwyl, 1882)

References

Pamphagidae